Chesterfield County Public Schools is the public school system of Chesterfield County, Virginia, United States. As of 2020, there are about 63,000 students enrolled in 64 schools. There are 39 elementary schools (grades K-5), 12 middle schools (grades 6-8), and 11 high schools (grades 9-12). Additionally, high school students can enroll in 13 specialty centers, two technical centers, and two Governor's Schools.

Leadership

Superintendent 
The Superintendent of Chesterfield County Public Schools in Mervin B. Daugherty. Prior to his appointment, he was the superintendent of Red Clay Consolidated School District in Delaware.

School Board 
There are fire members of the Chesterfield County School Board: 

 Debbie Bailey (Dale)
 Ann Coker-Chair (Bermuda District)
 Kathryn S. Haines -Vice Chair (Midlothian District)
 Ryan Harter (Mataoca)
 Dorothy Heffron (Clover Hill)

Elementary

Middle

High schools
Students can apply to the hosted specialty centers across the country regardless of their zoned high schools.

Governor's schools
Chesterfield County students may apply to the following governor's schools:
 Appomattox Regional Governor's School for the Arts and Technology
 Maggie L. Walker Governor's School for Government and International Studies

Secondary Advanced Course Offerings 
CCPS offers Advanced Placement (AP) courses, Dual Enrollment (DE) courses from Brightpoint Community College, and International Baccalaureate (IB) courses at Midlothian and Meadowbrook High School.

References

Further reading

External links
 Chesterfield County Public Schools
 

 
Public Schools
School divisions in Virginia